Najib Azmi Mikati (born 24 November 1955) is a Lebanese politician and businessman, and three-time Prime Minister of Lebanon whose current term began in September 2021. He also serves as the resigned prime minister of a cabinet that when assembled with a majority of its members acts as President of Lebanon for emergency situations, and this since the end of the term of president Michel Aoun as of October 2022. He previously served as Prime Minister from June 2011 to February 2014 and from April to July 2005. He also served as Minister of Public Works and Transport from December 1998 to 2003.

In 2005, he headed an interim government that supervised the general election following the withdrawal of Syrian troops. In 2011, he formed his second government backed by the March 8 alliance, before he resigned in 2013. He was a member of parliament for Tripoli from 2000 to 2005 and was re-elected in 2009 and 2018. In July 2021, he was designated as Prime Minister.

According to Forbes, he is the richest man in Lebanon, with a net worth of $2.5 billion in 2021. He has been subject of multiple corruption accusations, and was charged with illegitimate gains. Mikati was close to the Syrian government and operated several telecom projects in Syria and Lebanon.

Early life and education
Mikati was born on 24 November 1955 and hails from a prominent Sunni Muslim family based in Tripoli. He graduated from the American University of Beirut in 1980 with a Master of Business Administration (MBA) degree. He also attended a summer school program held at Harvard and the French business school INSEAD.

Business career and wealth

In 1979, Najib's older brother Taha Mikati founded Arabian Construction Company (ACC), headquartered in Abu Dhabi, and which became one of the largest construction companies in the Middle East. Najib Mikati co-founded the telecommunications company Investcom with his brother Taha in 1982. He sold the company in June 2006 to South Africa's MTN Group for $5.5 billion.

He is a major shareholder in the South African telecommunications operator MTN, owner of the high-end fashion brand "Façonnable", and investor in transport, gas and oil. He also has investments in real estate, notably in London, New York and Monaco.

He owns the 79m motor yacht Mimtee.

Political career
After being appointed Minister of Public Works and Transport on 4 December 1998, Mikati was elected to the Lebanese parliament from his hometown of Tripoli in 2000, outpolling Omar Karami, who was elected from the same multimember constituency. As a parliamentarian, Mikati retained his cabinet position and developed a reputation as a moderately pro-Syrian politician with a normal relationship with Syrian president Bashar Assad. Later Mikati was made transportation minister and became an ally of then Lebanese president Emile Lahoud, supporting the extension of his term in 2004.

He is considered a compromise figure, not being close to any particular political bloc. He is one of the leaders of the Sunni community. He himself denies any closeness to Hezbollah and describes himself as a liberal, emphasizing his background in business to reassure the United States.

First premiership

Mikati was a perennial candidate for Lebanon's prime ministry since 2000, finally taking the office upon the resignation of Omar Karami on 13 April 2005. During negotiations to form a government, Mikati emerged as a consensus candidate. Mikati acted as a caretaker premier. He is the leader of the solidarity bloc, which has had two seats in the Lebanese parliament since 2004. He also created the centrist movement and ideology in Lebanon and the Arab world, for which he has held many international conferences in Lebanon. In the general elections of 2009, Mikati won again a seat from Tripoli, being a member of the centrist groups in the Lebanese parliament.

Second premiership

On 24 January 2011, the March 8 alliance, specifically Hezbollah, Michel Aoun and Walid Jumblatt, nominated Mikati to become prime minister. Mikati succeeded Saad Hariri, whose government was brought down by the resignation of ten of the alliance's ministers and one presidential appointee on 12 January 2011, resulting from the collapse of the Saudi-Syrian initiative to reach a compromise on the Special Tribunal for Lebanon. On 25 January, 68 members of the parliament of Lebanon voted in favor of nominating Mikati for Prime Minister. President of Lebanon Michel Suleiman then invited Mikati to head a new Lebanese government. The process of government formation lasted for five months due to serious disagreements between leaders. On 13 June 2011, Mikati became the Prime Minister of Lebanon for the second time.

On 13 June, Mikati announced the formation of the government and stated that it would begin by "liberating land that remains under the occupation of the Israeli enemy". On 22 March 2013, Mikati resigned from office, due to "intensifying pressure between the pro-Assad and anti-Assad camps" and the Lebanese president accepted his resignation on 23 March 2013. On 6 April 2013, Tammam Salam was tasked to form a new government.

Third premiership 

Following the resignation of Prime Minister Hassan Diab in August 2020, both Mustafa Adib and Saad Hariri failed to form a government. Mikati was designated to fill the role on 26 July 2021. He received 72 votes out of 128 MPs. Mikati declared that he wants a purely technocratic government, without representatives of political parties, in order to carry out the economic reforms expected by Lebanon's donors. His appointment was received coldly by the population. As the country sinks into a serious economic, social and humanitarian crisis, he is seen as a representative of the traditional political class and economic elites. According to the daily L'Orient-Le Jour, “if being a billionaire has long been an asset in establishing someone on the Lebanese political scene, it is now perceived by part of the population as a symbol of the plundering of public resources by the political class. On September 10, 2021, Mikati was able to form a government of 24 members after long negotiations with President Aoun, and the various political parties. When he took office, Lebanon was in the grip of a very serious economic crisis: collapse of the national currency, galloping inflation (the cost of food had jumped by 700% in the previous two years), massive layoffs, a poverty rate of 78% according to the UN, frequent power cuts, fuel shortages, etc. He announced that he wanted to call on the solidarity of the Arab world to try to get the country out of the crisis it was going through and to negotiate with the IMF.

In February 2022, Patriarch Bechara Boutros Al-Rai, Lebanese senior Christian cleric and head of the Maronite Church, called on the Mikati government to "agree with the IMF on a plan that saves Lebanon from collapse".

He was again named prime minister designate on 23 June 2022 with 54 votes against Nawaf Salam's 28 to form a new cabinet until the remainder of President Michel Aoun's term. However, Mikati and Aoun failed to agree on a new government numerous times. President Michel Aoun signed the government's resignation decree, a day before his six-year term officially ended, and Najib Mikati's government remained in office in a caretaker capacity, however Aoun's move was deemed as of no effect by the Lebanese Parliament in a session held on November 3 since the government was already considered resigned following parliamentary elections on May 15.

Corruption allegations 
In 2019, state prosecutor Ghada Aoun pressed charges against Mikati over illegitimate enrichment via subsidised housing loans.

In October 2021, Mikati was named in the Pandora Papers leak. He denied any wrongdoing.

References

Bibliography

External links

|-

|-

1955 births
Living people
Mikati family
People from Tripoli, Lebanon
Prime Ministers of Lebanon
American University of Beirut alumni
American University of Beirut trustees
Harvard Business School people
Lebanese billionaires
20th-century Lebanese businesspeople
Lebanese Sunni Muslims
Members of the Parliament of Lebanon
People named in the Pandora Papers
21st-century Lebanese politicians
Azm Movement politicians
20th-century Lebanese politicians